{{DISPLAYTITLE:N-Phenylacetyl-L-prolylglycine ethyl ester}}

N-Phenylacetyl--prolylglycine ethyl ester is promoted as a nootropic and is a prodrug of cyclic glycine-proline. Other names include the brand name Noopept, developmental code GVS-111; proposed INN omberacetam.

Its synthesis was first reported in 1996. It is orally available, and as of 2017 its metabolism and elimination half-life were not well understood, and cycloprolylglycine has not been measured in humans following administration. In cell culture, cycloprolylglycine increases brain derived neurotrophic factor (BDNF).

It has been evaluated for neuroprotective effects in treating brain injuries and stroke.

Pharmacology
One oft-cited study (originally published in Russian) conducted on rats, suggests that Noopept works via the "antioxidant effect, the anti-inflammatory action, and the ability to inhibit the neurotoxicity of excess calcium and glutamate, and to improve the blood rheology".

Some studies suggest that the pharmacological properties of Noopept are derived from its action as an activator of Hypoxia-inducible factor (HIF-1).

Most of the effects of Noopept could be explained by its action as an activator of HIF-1.

Dosage 
Noopept is frequently dosed at 10-30mg per day. However, there is no solid evidence indicating that any dose of Noopept is optimal. Few human trials have ever been carried out on Noopept, and as one meta-analysis notes, animal studies have used doses ranging from 0.1mg/kg bodyweight to 10mg/kg bodyweight. Furthermore, no long-term studies have been done to evaluate the lasting effects of chronic use at any given dose; the longest human study lasted for 56 days. There is, therefore, no dose of Noopept which may be called "safe".

Legal status
Hungary: As of 25 August 2020, Noopept is added to the controlled psychoactive substances list, prohibiting production, sale, import, storage and use.
Russia: Noopept in Russia is a drug of medicine and is available without a prescription.
United Kingdom: Contrary to popular belief, omberacetam is not illegal to produce, supply, or import under the Psychoactive Substance Act in the UK, which came into effect on May 26, 2016 because it does neither work as a CNS (central nervous system) depressant, nor as a CNS stimulant. However, sale and supply for human consumption are prohibited.
United States: The Food and Drug Administration has issued import alerts for imports of omberacetam, considering it an analog of piracetam. FDA considers such racetam-family substances Active Pharmaceutical Ingredients (APIs) that require new drug applications and adequate labelling before being imported. Similarly, warnings have been issued for claims of medical and pharmacological effects of this officially non-drug substance. Despite these FDA enforcement actions, omberacetam is sold in over-the-counter supplements in this US with some products formulated with dosages greater than pharmaceutical levels.

See also 
Modafinil
Nootropic
Stimulant

References 

Racetams
Pyrrolidines
Ethyl esters
Russian drugs